FK Atlaschi is an Uzbekistani football club based in Margilan. Currently it plays in the Uzbekistan First League

History
FK Atlaschi was founded in 1993. The club played a total of four seasons in the Uzbek League, playing their first season in 1994. The last season the club played in the Uzbek League was in 1997. In 2012 the club played in Uzbekistan First League, Zone "East".

Achievements
Uzbek League:
 7th place: 1995

References

External links
 FK Atlaschi matches and results at sportepoch.com
 FK Atlaschi matches and results at scoresway.com

Football clubs in Uzbekistan
1993 establishments in Uzbekistan
Association football clubs established in 1993
Fergana Region